The Lola T87/00 is an open-wheel racing car chassis, designed and built by Lola Cars that competed in the CART open-wheel racing series, for competition in the 1987 IndyCar season. It won a total of 2 races and took 8 pole positions that season, including the prestigious Indianapolis 500, all with Mario Andretti. It was powered by the  Ford-Cosworth DFX.

References 

Open wheel racing cars
American Championship racing cars
Lola racing cars